Officer Negative was a Christian punk band from Ventura. Formed in 1995 and initially disbanded in 2000, the band released two albums and an EP on Screaming Giant Records. They played old-school punk, and though their music never appeared in a polished form, it was said to "never hold back the passion." Following a period of reformation they reappeared as The Death Campaign and toured until 2004.

Background
Their first album, Dead to the World (1997) was described as "angry punk" and the band was likened to Rancid or Black Flag.

Their 1999 release Zombie Nation was mired in difficulties with their label. Its sound deviated from the band's hoped sound by introducing pop sensibilities – to the point where its members would call it "not a true representation of the band." Also, several tracks were cut from the release; two were released the next year as a split EP with Lugnut. The third, called "Failure to Submit", was described by Chad Wiggins "by far, one of the best songs we have ever written." It was this release which garnered the most attention for the band. The release included the album Live at the Roxy. Together, with the future of the band uncertain at best, HM Magazine referred to this release as the band's "swan song."

In late 1999 the departure of bassist Casey Wisenbaker, along with the band's issues with Zombie lead to the dissolution of the band. With the return of Wisenbacker in 2000, the band reformed with new members taking guitar and drums. Vocalist Chad Wiggins saw the reformation of the band as an opportunity to refocus the band on ministry. With this lineup they toured until about 2002, releasing an EP and an album. Their 2002 release Control is an Illusion had a sound based more on metal than punk.

The band rebranded themselves as The Death Campaign, eventually signing to Solid State Records. In the summer of 2003, the band asked lead vocalist Chad Wiggins to leave, intending for Casey Wisenbaker to take vocals, and hiring a bass player from a band called Akeldama. Within three months of Wiggins departure the band broke up. However, during this short period they had created an album, which was eventually released as Officer Negative Presents The Death Campaign in 2004.

After the breakup guitarist Josh Handley formed Zippy Josh and the Rag Tag Band, and released one album, Stupidville in 1999. The album was basically praise and worship music, and described as "the Sex Pistols meet Bob Dylan." Allender and Wisenbaker joined a hardcore band called Hit the Deck, while Osborne and Buli continued to work with Akeldama. Michael Dragon briefly pursued a career in professional skateboarding.

Discography

1997: Dead to the World (Screaming Giant)
1999: Zombie Nation
1999: Live
1999: Live at the Roxy
2000: Split EP (with The Combat Junkies)
2000: Split EP (with Lugnut)
2002: Control is an Illusion (Something Sacred)
2004: Officer Negative Presents the Death Campaign (Solid State)

MembersFinal line-up Casey Wisenbaker – bass guitar (1998–2003), vocals (2003–2004)
 Taylor Allender – guitar (2000–2004)
 Todd Wisenbaker – guitar (2000–2004)
 Joey Buli – guitar (2000–2004)
 Roger Bell – keyboard (2000–2004)
 Mark Popovich – bass guitar (2003–2004)
 Chris Zimmerman – drums (2003–2004)Former members'
 Josh Handley – guitar (1995–1999)
 Chad Wiggins – vocals (1995–2003)
 Michael Dragon – drums (1997–2000)
 Daniel Osborne – drums (2000–2003)

Timeline

References

External links
 

Christian rock groups from California
Christian punk groups
Musical groups established in 1995
Solid State Records artists
Musical groups from Ventura County, California